Stenoplax conspicua, the conspicuous chiton, is a species of polyplacophoran mollusc belonging to the family Ischnochitonidae.

Description
These chitons may be gray, green and brown, commonly with pink in the middle of the valves.

Distribution and habitat
This species can be found in Mexico, Baja California. It lives in the middle and low tide zone under small rocks partially buried in the sand.

References

Ischnochitonidae
Molluscs described in 1892